The men's marathon competition of the athletics events at the 2011 Pan American Games took place on the 30 of October at the Pan American Marathon circuit. The defending Pan American Games champion is Franck de Almeida of Brazil.

Records

Qualification standards
This event did not require any qualification standard be met.

Schedule

Abbreviations
All times shown are in hours:minutes:seconds

Results
21 athletes from 14 countries competed.

Final

References

Athletics at the 2011 Pan American Games
2011
Panamerican
2011
2011 Panamerican Games